Hippolytpuszta is a former village, now a part of Szabadegyháza, Hungary. The postal code is 2432.

Geography 

Altitude of Hippolytpuszta is 122 meters.

It currently has a population of around 2 (in 2001).

It lies approximately 6 km north of Szabadegyháza.

References 

Populated places in Fejér County